is a Japanese manga series written by Kazuo Koike and illustrated by . It was followed by two sequels, Shin Nijitte Monogatari and Shin Nijitte Monogatari Tsurujirō. It is one of the manga series with most volumes, with 110 volumes.

References

External links

Kazuo Koike
2003 comics endings
2005 comics endings
2012 comics endings
Shogakukan manga
Seinen manga